The Mbaka are a minority ethnic group in the Central African Republic and northwest Democratic Republic of the Congo. The M'Baka speak the Mbaka language and have a population of roughly 300,000.

Language
The Mbakas speak Mbaka language, a Ubangian language. The Gilima variety is assigned to a separate ISO 639-3 code.

Famous Mbaka people
Jean-Bédel Bokassa, former President and self-styled Emperor of Central African Republic
David Dacko, First President of Central African Republic
Barthélemy Boganda, First Prime Minister of Central African Republic
Adamu Jamu Mbaka, Air Vice Marshall, Nigerian Airforce
Pius Adamu Mbaka, Major, Nigerian Army
Alex Jamu Mbaka, Major, Nigerian Army
Koffi Olomide, Congolese singer

Notes

References
.

 
Ethnic groups in the Central African Republic
Ethnic groups in the Democratic Republic of the Congo